The Santa Fe 2900 Class was a series of 30 4-8-4 type steam locomotives built between 1943 and 1944 for Atchison, Topeka and Santa Fe Railroad and pulled freight and passenger trains until retirement in the early to late-1950s.

Today, six 2900s survive, with five units on static display and one, No. 2926, has been restored to operating condition in Albuquerque, New Mexico. When it was fully restored in July 2021, it is considered to be the largest operating 4-8-4 type steam locomotive in the United States.

History
Being built during World War II, wartime shortages of lightweight metals resulted in ordinary metals being used for their construction. This resulted in the class being the heaviest 4-8-4s ever built. They outweighed their nearest rivals by over 2,000 pounds. They have Timken roller bearings on all axles. Between 1946 and 1948, they were then approved for 110 mph speeds with the Santa Fe's express passenger trains after being fitted with Timken roller bearing tandem side-rods, up from 100-mph when delivered with its original side-rods.

Though they were designed to haul passenger trains, wartime exigencies required that they also haul fast freight until the war ended. After the war, they hauled passenger trains such as the Chief, Scout and Grand Canyon Limited. After diesels took over, the class was retired by 1959.

Preservation
Six 2900s survived into preservation:
 2903 is displayed at the Illinois Railway Museum in Union, Illinois. 
 2912 is displayed at the Pueblo Railway Museum in Pueblo, Colorado.
 2913 is displayed at Riverview Park in Fort Madison, Iowa.
 2921 is now displayed at the Modesto Amtrak Station in Modesto, California. The locomotive is no longer on display at Beard Brook Park.
 2925 is displayed at the California State Railroad Museum in Sacramento, California.
 2926 moved from Coronado Park in Albuquerque, New Mexico in 1999 to the New Mexico Steam Locomotive and Railroad Historical Society there; then moved locally for rebuilding to operating condition. Restoration is largely complete as of July, 2021, though work is continuing. On October 1, 2007, No. 2926 was added to the National Register of Historic Places.

Roster

References

Atchison, Topeka and Santa Fe Railway locomotives
4-8-4 locomotives
Baldwin locomotives
Passenger locomotives
Railway locomotives introduced in 1943
Tourist attractions in Albuquerque, New Mexico
Preserved steam locomotives of the United States
Standard gauge locomotives of the United States